Faversham and Mid Kent is a constituency represented in the House of Commons of the UK Parliament. Since 2015, the seat has been represented by Helen Whately of the Conservative Party.

Constituency profile
Faversham and Mid Kent covers a mainly rural sweep around the North Downs, including part of Swale and Maidstone boroughs. Some of the traditional farming industry remains. Residents' health and wealth are around average for the UK.

Boundaries

1997–2010: The Borough of Swale wards of Abbey, Boughton & Courtenay, Davington Priory, East Downs, St Ann's, Teynham and Lynsted, and Watling, and the Borough of Maidstone wards of Bearsted, Boxley, Detling, Harrietsham and Lenham, Headcorn, Hollingbourne, Langley, Leeds, Park Wood, Shepway East, Shepway West, Sutton Valence, and Thurnham.

2010–present: The Borough of Swale wards of Abbey, Boughton and Courtenay, Davington Priory, East Downs, St Ann's, and Watling, and the Borough of Maidstone wards of Bearsted, Boughton Monchelsea and Chart Sutton, Boxley, Detling and Thurnham, Downswood and Otham, Harrietsham and Lenham, Headcorn, Leeds, North Downs, Park Wood, Shepway North, Shepway South, and Sutton Valence and Langley.

The boundary change in  1997 caused minor confusion among a large minority of residents of the Maidstone electoral wards as a constituency named Maidstone and The Weald was also created at the same time (largely replacing the former Maidstone constituency), but residents in the Shepway and Park Wood areas of the town found themselves in Faversham and Mid Kent instead.

History
In 1997, the Faversham and Mid Kent constituency was formed when the previous Faversham seat was abolished and split into Sittingbourne and Sheppey and the town of Faversham which was then merged with Mid Kent to form this constituency.

Members of Parliament

Elections

Elections in the 2010s

Elections in the 2000s

Elections in the 1990s

See also
List of parliamentary constituencies in Kent

Notes

References

Sources
Election result, 2005 (BBC)
Election results, 1997 - 2001 (BBC)
Election results, 1997 - 2001  (Election Demon)
Election results, 1997 - 2005  (Guardian)

Constituencies of the Parliament of the United Kingdom established in 1997
Politics of Swale
Parliamentary constituencies in Kent